Solomon Halberstam may refer to:
 Shlomo Halberstam (first Bobover rebbe)
 Shlomo Halberstam (third Bobover rebbe)
 Solomon Joachim Halberstam – Austrian scholar and author of the Ḳehillat Shelomoh catalog